The Association for Student Conduct Administration (ASCA) (formerly the Association for Student Judicial Affairs) is the leading voice for student conduct administration within higher education, conflict resolution, law and public policy related to student conduct administration.  ASCA also attracts members who work in higher education prevention education and Title IX administrators in the United States.  Founded in 1987 ASCA has over 3,000 members at over 1,000 institutions. ASCA's headquarters resided on the campus of Texas A&M University in College Station, Texas until 2018.  ASCA is still based in College Station, with a satellite office on Dupont Circle in Washington, D.C.

Mission 
The mission statement of ASCA is to support higher education professionals by providing education materials and resources, intentional professional development opportunities and a network of colleagues to facilitate best practices of student conduct administration and conflict resolution on college and university campuses.

History 
The creation of the Association for Student Judicial Affairs was spearheaded by Donald D. Gehring of the University of Louisville in conversations with colleagues at the Stetson University Law and Higher Education Conference.  ASJA officially came to form in 1987 with the creation of a steering committee and funding support from Raymond Goldstone of the University of California, Los Angeles.

ASJA held its first annual conference in 1989 and began the annual Donald D. Gehring Academy for Student Conduct Administration in 1993.  In 2008, ASJA changed its name to the Association for Student Conduct Administration (ASCA).  In 2015, ASCA opened a satellite office in Washington, D.C., in collaboration with the American College Personnel Association, to facilitate more interaction with other higher education professional associations and to assist public policy advocacy efforts.

Professional development
ASCA produces several national professional development programs each year, including an annual conference, the Donald D. Gehring Academy for Student Conduct Administration, a Title IX and Sexual Misconduct Institute, as well as national collaborations with other professional associations such as NASPA, the Association of Fraternity Advisors, and the National Association for Campus Activities.

Structure and communities of practice
ASCA is organizationally divided into four geographic regions administered by regional chairs with each state having a state coordinator.  The association sponsors committees and communities of practice on topics such as conflict resolution, research, academic integrity, assessment, community colleges, fraternity and sorority life, public policy and legislative issues, mental health, threat assessment and sexual assault.

Advocacy efforts
After the release of the Department of Education's Office for Civil Rights (OCR) "Dear Colleague Letter" discussing Title IX and campus sexual assault in April 2011, ASCA leadership and publications were frequently cited in the national media to discuss topics related to sexual assault response.  ASCA has voiced support for the OCR-required preponderance of the evidence standard in campus sexual assault adjudications, mandatory academic transcript notation for serious disciplinary matters, and advocacy for institutionally-based discipline processes.

ASCA has received criticism from popular media outlets Huffington Post and Jezebel for a perceived focus on educational outcomes in campus sexual assault adjudication. ASCA responded to those concerns with the publication of a "Gold Standard" report on sexual assault adjudication practices.

Foundation
The Raymond Goldstone ASCA Foundation provides funds for scholarships to ASCA professional development opportunities such as the annual conference or Gehring Academy.

References

External links

Educational organizations based in the United States
Organizations established in 1987
1987 establishments in Texas
Organizations based in Texas
Education-related professional associations